Bill Ward (born 5 May 1967) is an English actor. He is known for his soap opera roles as Mike Parker in Eastenders Charlie Stubbs in Coronation Street and James Barton in Emmerdale.

Early life
Ward was educated at Oundle School and Bristol University where he obtained a degree in Modern British History, and worked as an advertising executive before beginning his professional acting career in the 1980s.

Career
He acted widely in theatre and television, joining the cast of Coronation Street in 2003, portraying local builder Charlie Stubbs, until 2007 when his character was killed by Tracy Barlow after a domestic abuse storyline. He made his second appearance in a major soap opera role as James Barton in Emmerdale beginning in 2013. However, Ward announced in August 2016 that he is quitting the soap, his character was killed off in October 2016. Outside acting, Ward is noted as a photographer. Bill Ward also had a role back in 2003 in BBC TV's EastEnders, where he played the role of Mike Parker. He also has had roles in hit shows such as ITV's The Bill, Heartbeat and many more well known shows. In 2019, he starred as retired drag queen Hugo Battersby / Loco Chanelle in acclaimed musical Everybody's Talking About Jamie at the Apollo Theatre for a very limited run. In December 2020, it was revealed that Ward had undertaken work as a delivery driver for Tesco after several acting jobs he had scheduled were cancelled due to the COVID-19 pandemic.

Filmography

References

External links

1967 births
Living people
English male soap opera actors
Male actors from Newcastle upon Tyne
People educated at Oundle School